Trantlebeg  is a small village east of the Halladale River in Forsinard, east Sutherland, Scottish Highlands and is in the Scottish council area of Highland.

The village of Croick lies less than 1 mile, directly north, along the A897 road.

Populated places in Sutherland